KCOZ (The Lookout 91.7 FM, College of the Ozarks Christian Radio) is a radio station that broadcast a Jazz music format until switching to a Contemporary Christian music format in late 2011. Licensed to Point Lookout, Missouri, United States, the station is currently owned by College of the Ozarks. Previously the radio station operated as KSOZ, a National Public Radio (NPR) affiliate. As of January 2021, KCOZ can be found streaming online at KCOZ.live and also on the KCOZ Radio app.

References

External links
 
 

Contemporary Christian radio stations in the United States
COZ
Radio stations established in 1973
1973 establishments in Missouri
COZ